Đorđe Perišić (Serbian Cyrillic: Ђорђе Перишић; born 6 May 1941) is a Montenegrin water polo player notable for winning a gold medal in Mexico City in 1968, with the Yugoslavian water polo team.

See also
 Yugoslavia men's Olympic water polo team records and statistics
 List of Olympic champions in men's water polo
 List of Olympic medalists in water polo (men)

References

External links
 

1941 births
Living people
People from Kotor
Montenegrin male water polo players
Yugoslav male water polo players
Olympic swimmers of Yugoslavia
Olympic water polo players of Yugoslavia
Olympic gold medalists for Yugoslavia
Swimmers at the 1960 Summer Olympics
Water polo players at the 1968 Summer Olympics
Water polo players at the 1972 Summer Olympics
Olympic medalists in water polo
Medalists at the 1968 Summer Olympics